Community policing or community-oriented policing (COP) is a strategy of policing that focuses on developing relationships with community members. It is a philosophy of full-service policing that is highly personal, where an officer patrols the same area for an extended time and develops a partnership with citizens to collaboratively identify and solve problems.

The goal is for police to build relationships with the community, including through local agencies to reduce antisocial behaviour and low-level crime, but the broken windows theory proposes that this can reduce serious crimes as well.

Community policing is related to problem-oriented policing and intelligence-led policing, and contrasted with reactive policing strategies which were predominant in the late 20th century. Many police forces have teams that focus specifically on community policing.

History
Values of community policing have been linked to Sir Robert Peel's 1829 Peelian Principles, most notably John Alderson, the former Chief Constable of Devon and Cornwall Police. Peel's ideas included that the police needed to seek the cooperation of the public and prioritize crime prevention. The term "community policing" came into use in the late 20th century, and then only as a response to a preceding philosophy of police organization.

In the early 20th century, the rise of automobiles, telecommunications and suburbanization impacted how the police operated. Researchers noted that police moved towards reactive strategies rather than proactive, focusing on answering emergency calls quickly and relying on motor vehicle patrols to deter crime. Some police forces such as the Chicago Police Department began rotating officers between different neighborhoods as a measure to prevent corruption and, as a result, foot patrols became rare. This changed the nature of police presence in many neighborhoods.

By the 1960s, many countries including the United States attempted to repair relationships between police forces and black people. In 1967, American President Lyndon B. Johnson appointed a Blue Ribbon committee to study the apparent distrust of the police by many community members, especially along racial lines. The resulting report, the President's Commission on Law Enforcement and Administration of Justice suggested developing a new type of police officer who would act as a community liaison and work to build relationships between law enforcement and  minority populations. The Kansas City preventive patrol experiment concluded that motor patrols were not an effective deterrent to crime.  Similarly, by 1981, a study by the US-based Police Foundation suggested that police officers spent inadequate time on response duties and in cars that they had become isolated from their communities. In response to some of these problems, many police departments in the United States began experimenting with what would become known as "community policing".

Research by Michigan criminal justice academics and practitioners started being published as early as the 1980s. Bob Trajanowcz, a professor of criminal justice in the late 1990s, influenced many future law enforcement leaders on how to implement elements of community policing  One experiment in Flint, Michigan, involved foot patrol officers be assigned to a specific geographic area to help reduce crime in hot spots. Community-oriented policing was promoted by the Clinton Administration. The 1994 Violent Crime Control and Law Enforcement Act established the Office of Community Oriented Policing Services (COPS) within the Justice Department and provided funding to promote community policing.

Kenneth Peak has argued that community policing in the United States has evolved through three generations: innovation (1979 to 1986), diffusion (1987 to 1994), and institutionalization (1995 to the present day).  He says the innovation period occurred following the civil unrest of the 1960s, in large part as an attempt to identify alternatives to the reactive methods developed in mid-century. This era also saw the development of such programs like the broken windows theory and problem-oriented policing. Peak says the diffusion era followed, in which larger departments began to integrate aspects of community policing, often through grants that initiated specialized units. Lastly, the institutionalization era introduced the mass application of community policing programs, in not only large departments but also smaller and more rural ones.

Method

Many community-oriented police structures focus on assigning officers to a specific area called a "beat", during this officers become familiar with that area through a process of "beat profiling". The officers are then taught how to design specific patrol strategies to deal with the types of crime that are experienced in that beat.

These ideas are implemented in a multi-pronged approach using a variety of aspects, such as broadening the duties of the police officer and individualizing the practices to the community they're policing; refocusing police efforts to face-to-face interactions in smaller patrol areas with an emphasized goal of preventing criminal activity instead of responding to it; solving problems using input from the community they're policing; and, finally, making an effort to increase service-oriented positive interactions with police.

Common methods of community-policing include:

 Encouraging the community to help prevent crime by providing advice, talking to students, and encouraging neighborhood watch groups. 
 Increased use of foot or bicycle patrols.
 Increased officer accountability to the communities they serve.
 Creating teams of officers to carry out community policing in designated neighborhoods.
 Clear communication between the police and the communities about their objectives and strategies.
 Partnerships with other organizations such as government agencies, community members, nonprofit service providers, private businesses, and the media.
 Moving toward some decentralizing of the police authority, allowing more discretion among lower-ranking officers, and more initiative expected from them.

The Dallas experiment 
In 1971, the leadership of the Dallas Police Department wanted to redefine the role of Dallas police officers by identifying the basic needs of the Dallas community and restructuring police services to respond to those needs. The department sought to increase the number of minority police officers and to place those officers in minority communities. The department and foundation aimed to show that individual police officers have as much personal stake in providing better services as do members of the communities in which officers work.

The Cincinnati team policing experiment 
Experimentation with team policing was recommended in the President's Commission on Law Enforcement and Administration of Justice in 1967. Neighborhood team policing was seen by many as a promising way to address problems of over-centralization and bureaucratization of police agencies and an increasing sense of alienation of citizens and police. The experiment focused attention on the need for police to become closer to the community and on some of the barriers that must be overcome to achieve this goal.

Comparison with traditional policing
Although researchers say that societies incorporate some mechanisms of social control, "policing" (as it is currently understood) is a very particular mechanism of control. "Traditional policing" is used to describe policing styles that were predominant before modern community policing movements, or in police forces which have not adopted them. The response-centered style has also been called "fire brigade policing" in the UK. In countries with a tradition of policing by consent, the term "traditional policing" can be misleading. In those cases, Mike Brogden says community policing could be seen as a restoration of an earlier ideology, which had been overshadowed by reactive policing after the rise of automobiles and telecommunications.

The goal of traditional policing is to protect law-abiding citizens from criminals. As Jauregui notes, it reflects a "popular desire for justice and order through any means necessary." He says police do this by identifying and apprehending criminals while gathering enough evidence to convict them. Traditional beat officers' approach on duty is to respond to incidents swiftly, and clear emergency calls as quickly as possible. Some researchers argue that this type of policing does not stop or reduce crime significantly, and say it is simply a temporary fix to a chronic problem where officers are often called to return to the same issue and individuals.

In contrast, community policing's main goal is to assist the public in establishing and maintaining a safe, orderly social environment. While apprehending criminals is one important goal of community policing, it is not the only goal. Community policing is concerned with solving the crimes that the community is concerned about by working with and gaining support from the community. Research indicates that the most effective methods include dialogue between police, government resources, citizens, and local business to address the problems affecting the community. Police communicate with the community in a variety of ways, including polls or surveys, town meetings, call-in programs, and meetings with interest groups. They use these connections to understand what the community wants out of its police officers and what the community is willing to do to solve its crime problem.

The structure of the community policing organization differs in that police assets are refocused with the goals of specific, written rules to give more creative problem-solving techniques to the police officer to provide alternatives to traditional law enforcement.

In Nordic countries and Camden, New Jersey 
Journalist Ryan Cooper described law enforcement in Nordic countries in terms that seem consistent with community policing. In 2013 the city of Camden, New Jersey, with support from the state government, disbanded their city police and hired some of the officers back at lower pay into new Camden County Police Department, following examples in Nordic countries. Camden had previously had higher than average crime rates, which have reportedly declined dramatically since the change, presumably because more people are more likely to report crime and cooperate with law enforcement. Unfortunately, the truth may be that the CCPD is reclassifying crime statistics in order to spin the narrative and present itself as a success story when in reality defunding its police department was a failed experiment.

In high conflict zones 
D. Scott Mann, retired U.S. Special Forces Lieutenant Colonel, says that his troops made substantial progress against insurgents in places like Afghanistan and Columbia by embedding themselves in local, remote communities and working hard to protect the locals from insurgents.  Mann says they were not resisted when they initially arrive, but they were also not initially welcomed. After locals saw Mann's special forces working to understand their concerns and bleeding with them during attacks by insurgents, the locals begin to trust Mann's special forces and provide information about the insurgents that helped reduce the level of violence and make law enforcement easier, he says.

Community alienation
The experience of community alienation among police officers is closely tied to the experience of mastery, the state of mind in which an individual feels autonomous and experiences confidence in their ability, skill, and knowledge to control or influence external events. Community policing requires departments to flatten their organizational pyramid and place even more decision-making and discretion in the hands of line officers. Taylor and Fritsch say that as the level of community alienation or isolation that officers experience increases, there will be a corresponding decrease in officers' sense of mastery in carrying out their expanded discretionary role. Secondly, a strong sense of community integration for police officers would seem to be vital to the core community policing focus of proactive law enforcement, they say. Proactive enforcement is defined as the predisposition of police officers to be actively committed to crime prevention, community problem-solving, and a more open, dynamic quality-oriented law enforcement-community partnership.

A lack of community support resulted in an increased sense of alienation and a greater degree of apathy among police officers. This lack of community support along with working in a larger populated community was associated with an increased sense of alienation and a greater degree of inactivity among police officers. Alienation resulted in an increase of negative feelings and lethargy among police officers. Research has concluded that when police officers feel socially isolated from the community they serve, the more likely they were to withdraw and feel negatively towards their citizens.

Evaluation
Traditionally, determining whether police or policies are effective or not can be done by evaluating the crime rate for a geographic area. A crime rate in the United States is determined using the FBI's Uniform Crime Reports (UCR) or National Incident-Based Reporting System (NIBRS), as well as the Bureau of Justice Statistics' National Crime Victimization Survey (NCVS).

Community policing is more complicated than simply comparing crime rates and there are no universally accepted criteria for evaluating community policing. However, there are some structures that are commonly used. Researchers and officers say that one possible way to determine whether or not community policing is effective in an area is for officers and key members of the community to set a specific mission and goals when starting. Once specific goals are set, participation at every level is essential in obtaining commitment and achieving goals.

The U.S. federal government continues to provide support for incorporating community policing into local law enforcement practices through funding of research such as through the National Center for Community Policing at Michigan State University, small COPS grants to local agencies, and technical assistance.

The Center For Evidence-Based Crime Policy in George Mason University identifies the following randomized controlled trials on community policing as very rigorous.

Randomized controlled trials 

According to the National Institute of Justice, there has been a single high-quality randomized controlled trial that identifies the effect of community policing on individual attitudes towards the police. This study found that positive contact with police—delivered via brief door-to-door non-enforcement community policing visits—substantially improved residents' attitudes toward police, including legitimacy and willingness to cooperate. These effects remained large in a 21-d follow-up and were largest among nonwhite respondents. Specifically, the initial effect among Black residents was almost twice as large as the effect among White residents.

Benefits 

 Residents have a more favorable view of their local police department.
 Improved trust between law enforcement and residents.
 More accurate information from residents regarding criminal activity in their community.
 Better understanding of the needs of citizens and their expectations of the police.

Criticisms 
Criminologists have raised several concerns vis-a-vis community policing and its implementation.  Many legal scholars have highlighted that the term "community," at the heart of "community policing," is in itself ambiguous. Without a universal definition of the word, it is difficult to define what "community policing" should look like.

Others have remained skeptical of the political ambition behind community policing initiatives.  For example, in 1984 Peter Waddington cautioned that the "largely uncritical acceptance with which [the notion of community policing] has been welcomed is itself a danger. Any proposal, however attractive, should be subjected to careful and skeptical scrutiny." In particular, Waddington voiced concern that community policing was merely a restoration of the "bobby on the beat" concept, which had nostalgic appeal because it was less impersonal than the officer "flashing past" in a police car. He said that the former was a "romantic delusion", because "there was never a time when the police officer was everyone's friend, and there will never be such a time in the future." He also believed that order could only be maintained by the community itself, and not by the police alone.

Similarly, C. B. Klockars and David Bayley both argue that community policing is unlikely to bring fundamental change to how police officers work, with Klockars calling it "mainly a rhetorical device". Unlike Klockars, Steven Herbert believes that community policing is proposing a fundamental change to policing, but says that it would be a difficult one to achieve. He says the progressive and democratic ethos of shared governance inherent in community policing runs counter to central elements in police culture and more widespread understandings of crime and punishment. Charles P. McDowell proposed in 1993 that because community policing was a radical departure from existing ideology, implementing it would take time.

Other criticisms revolve around the potential efficacy of community policing. David Bayley has argued that enacting community policing policies may lead to a reduction in crime control effectiveness, maintenance of order in the face of violence, increase in bureaucratic and governmental power over community affairs, increases in unequal treatment, and an erosion of constitutional rights.  According to Stenson, there is a dilemma within community policing: when practicing community policing, police officers have the tendency of getting too involved with trying to institute "particularistic community normative standards". He says this could in turn be problematic, in that it could entice corruption or vigilantism.

See also
Evidence-based policing
Lambeth CPCG
Peelian principles
Predictive policing
Preventive police
Proactive policing
Stop-and-frisk in New York City
Tommy Norman
Kōban

References

Law enforcement techniques
Types of policing